Millhouses and Ecclesall railway station was a railway station in the Millhouses district of Sheffield, South Yorkshire, England.

History
It was built by the Midland Railway and was designed by the company architect John Holloway Sanders and opened in 1870  called Ecclesall. This was changed, first to Ecclesall & Millhouses and later Mill Houses & Ecclesall before becoming Millhouses and Ecclesall in 1932. It was situated on the Midland Main Line between Heeley railway station and Beauchief station, and was accessed from the Archer Road overbridge, near the junction of Abbeydale Road and Millhouses Lane.

The station was opened at the same time as the main line from Chesterfield with just 2 flanking platforms. Between 1901 and 1903 the line was widened and two lines added. The station now consisted of 4 platforms with two flanking platforms and an island platform in the centre. The station buildings were situated at road level with access by steps to the island platform.

The station closed on 10 June 1968, and remained derelict for many years. The station buildings and platforms were finally removed in the 1980s, but the stationmaster's house survives as a private home.

Calls for reopening
There have been numerous plans to rebuild a station, going as far as a feasibility study in 1997, but so far none have come to fruition.

In July 2017, it was proposed by Local Enterprise Partnership that new stations should be built at Millhouses and Heeley as well as new platforms at Dore & Totley. The plans would be part of a call to have better links in South Yorkshire area as well as plans for a new Woodhead Route reopening. In 2020, local MP Olivia Blake wrote to the transport secretary asking him to consider the reopening of the station, suggesting it would reduce congestion in the area.

References

Harvey, Peter (1996). Abbeydale and Millhouses. Stround: The Charlford Publishing Company Limited. 

Disused railway stations in Sheffield
Railway stations in Great Britain opened in 1870
Railway stations in Great Britain closed in 1968
Former Midland Railway stations
Beeching closures in England
John Holloway Sanders railway stations